Machado Silvetti  is an architecture and urban design firm headquartered in Boston, Massachusetts.  Incorporated in 1985, the firm's principals Rodolfo Machado and Jorge Silvetti have been in association since 1974.  They have been called "arguably Boston’s most influential firm of the last generation".

Machado and Silvetti's notable projects include the Bowdoin College Museum of Art, the Sam M. Walton College of Business at the University of Arkansas, The Getty Villa, the Boston Public Library's Honan-Allston Branch, the Provincetown Art Association and Museum, Utah Museum of Fine Arts, the Mint Museum, and One Western Avenue at Harvard University.

The firm has received numerous awards for its work, including the 2007 and 2008 American Architecture Award,  the 2006 Los Angeles Business Council Best Civic Architecture Award, the 2003 Harleston Parker Medal, 2003 AIA National Honor Award for Architecture, the 2002 Boston Society of Architects Honor Award, the 2002 AIA New England Honor Award, and the 2002 Boston Society of Architects Design Excellence in Housing Award.  Machado and Silvetti were awarded the American Academy and Institute of Arts and Letters's 1991 First Award in Architecture and the 9th International Award for Architecture in Stone in 2005.

Their work on the Getty Villa was praised as "a near miracle—a museum that elicits no smirks from the art world.... a masterful job... crafting a sophisticated ensemble of buildings, plazas, and landscaping that finally provides a real home for a relic of another time and place."

Machado and Silvetti's work has been hailed for its "conceptual clarity and visual intensity", and "the outstanding quality of their architectural principles."  "Construction as an art, and not as a mere technical instrument, is verifiable in each of their built projects, and specially visible in their exquisite details, full of meanings."

References

External links
  Machado Silvetti

Architecture firms based in Massachusetts